Rice Howard Place is an office tower complex in Edmonton, Alberta, Canada that was completed in 1983. It is located at 10060 Jasper Avenue in the heart of Downtown Edmonton. It is home to several long term tenants such as Grant Thornton, APEGGA, Ernst & Young, Duncan Craig LLP and Edmonton Transit. The namesake of the complex was Scotiabank, but was renamed in April of 2022 to Rice Howard Place after the move out of the anchor tenant, Scotiabank, to the new Stantec Tower at 10220 103 Ave.

The tallest tower in the complex is Tower 1, with 28 floors reaching . Followed by Tower 2, with 21 floors reaching .

Pedway
Edmonton's extensive Pedway system allows downtown visitors to travel indoors to avoid the extreme weather. Rice Howard Place is part of that pedway which is linked directly to both the Edmonton LRT system, Commerce Place, and Enbridge Centre.

See also
List of tallest buildings in Edmonton
Tour Scotia in Montreal
Scotia Plaza in Toronto

References

External links

Office buildings completed in 1983
Bank buildings in Canada
Skyscraper office buildings in Canada
Buildings and structures in Edmonton
Postmodern architecture in Canada
Skyscrapers in Edmonton
Scotiabank
1983 establishments in Alberta